The Russian Federation issued 16 platinum coins starting from 1992, with the face value of 25 (weighing 1/10 oz), 50 (1/4 oz) and 150 rubles (1/2 oz). Minting was suspended in 1996, with the last coin of 150 rubles dedicated to the 1240 Battle of the Neva.

Coins

See also
 Platinum coins of the Russian Empire
 Platinum coins of the Soviet Union

References

Coins of Russia
Platinum coins